Voikovo prison camp, or Camp No. 48, was a prisoner-of-war and internee camp maintained by the Main Administration for Affairs of Prisoners of War and Internees of the  NKVD in the Soviet Union. The camp was designated by the Soviet authorities for the high-ranking officers of the German Wehrmacht and the Waffen-SS and was unofficially known as the "Generals camp".

The camp was situated near the city of Ivanovo, Russian SFSR and was in operation from 1943 to 1955, when the last prisoners were repatriated to East Germany. The camp was located in an old inn and health spa and, although at times overcrowded, was dubbed "the Castle" for its relative luxury.

Select prisoners held at the camp
Wilhelm Mohnke
Friedrich Paulus
Arthur Schmidt
Walther von Seydlitz-Kurzbach
Arthur Schmidt
Karl Strecker
Gottfried Weber
Kurt Peter Muller
Hans-Joachim Baurmeister (died 1950)
Louis Tronnier (died 1952)
Walter von Boltenstern (died 1952)
Karl-Wilhelm Specht (died 1953)
Friedrich Bayer (died 1953)
Gerd-Paul von Below (died 1953)
Heinrich-Anton Deboi (died 1955)
Friedrich Hochbaum (died 1955)
Hans Boeckh-Behrens (died 1955)
Reiner Stahel (died 1955)
Max Pfeffer (died 1955)

Notes

References

Further reading 
 

German prisoners of war in World War II held by the Soviet Union
Prisons in the Soviet Union
World War II prisoner of war camps